Jadowniki Mokre  is a village in the administrative district of Gmina Wietrzychowice, within Tarnów County, Lesser Poland Voivodeship, in southern Poland.

The village has a population of 860.

References

Jadowniki Mokre